CX 32 Radiomundo is a Uruguayan Spanish-language AM radio station that broadcasts from Montevideo.

In March 2018, the station was relaunched with a mixture of news, interviews, arts and music.

Selected programs 
 En Perspectiva, led by Emiliano Cotelo

References

External links
 
 Radiomundo / En Perspectiva official website
 Radiomundo at Facebook

Spanish-language radio stations
Radio in Uruguay
Mass media in Montevideo
Radio stations established in 1978
1978 establishments in Uruguay